Leonor Margarida Coelho Andrade, also known as Ella Nor (born 13 September 1994) is a Portuguese singer and actress. She represented Portugal in the Eurovision Song Contest 2015 with the song "Há um mar que nos separa".

Career
In 2014, Andrade participated in season two of The Voice Portugal. She was eliminated on episode 13. After The Voice, Andrade joined the cast of RTP1 telenovela Água de Mar, where she played Joana Luz.

On 19 February 2015, Andrade was announced as one of the twelve participants of Festival da Canção 2015 with the song "Há um mar que nos separa". On 7 March 2015, she won the competition and thus was selected to represent Portugal in the Eurovision Song Contest 2015.

In 2023, she announced she was expecting a baby girl.

Discography

Albums

Singles

Music videos

See also
Portugal in the Eurovision Song Contest 2015

References

Living people
1994 births
People from Barreiro, Portugal
21st-century Portuguese women singers
Eurovision Song Contest entrants for Portugal
Eurovision Song Contest entrants of 2015
The Voice of Portugal contestants